The Duck Valley Indian Reservation was established in the 19th century for the federally recognized Shoshone-Paiute Tribe. It is isolated in the high desert of the western United States, and lies on the state line, the 42nd parallel, between Idaho and Nevada.

The reservation, in the shape of a square, is almost evenly divided in land area between the two states, with the northern 50.2 percent in southern Owyhee County, Idaho and the southern 49.8 percent in northwestern Elko County, Nevada. A resident population of 1,265 persons was reported in the 2000 census, more than 80 percent of whom lived on the Nevada side.

In October 2016 the Nevada Native Nations Land Act was passed to put Bureau of Land Management (BLM) and Forest Service lands into trust for six federally recognized tribes in the state. The Shoshone-Paiute Tribe will have  of Forest Service land added to their reservation. Some other tribes are receiving thousands of acres of trust lands. Gaming is prohibited on the new lands.

History

On April 16, 1877, President Rutherford B. Hayes established the Duck Valley Western Shoshone Reservation by Executive Order; it was also used for Northern Paiute people. Despite the Native Americans having a designated reservation, local settlers and some politicians tried to force the tribal members off the valuable Duck Valley lands in 1884, suggesting they should join their Western Shoshone kinsmen at the reservation at Fort Hall, Idaho. The bands' chiefs successfully resisted these efforts to be displaced from their lands.

Meanwhile, the Northern Paiute band joined with another branch of Shoshone in the Bannock War of 1878. Survivors were sent to a prisoner-of-war camp at the Yakama Indian Reservation in Yakima County, Washington. Upon their release, the Northern Paiute returned to the Duck Valley. President Grover Cleveland expanded the reservation by Executive Order on May 4, 1886 to accommodate the Paiute.

President William Howard Taft expanded the reservation to its current size by Executive Order on July 1, 1910. It was unusual to have two federal government actions to enlarge the  reservation after it was established; most federal actions have been taken to reduce the size of Indian reservations.

The Shoshone-Paiute Tribe of Duck Valley is one of five federally recognized tribes in the state of Idaho, each of which have reservations. The others are the Coeur d'Alene, Kootenai Tribe of Idaho, Nez Perce, and Shoshone-Bannock. It is one of several federally recognized tribes in Nevada, some of which include other Shoshone and Paiute bands.

Sister reservations

 Fort Hall Indian Reservation, Idaho
 Fort McDermitt Indian Reservation, Oregon/Nevada
 Duckwater Shoshone Tribe of the Duckwater Reservation
 Summit Lake Indian Reservation
 Pyramid Lake Indian Reservation
 Reno-Sparks Indian Colony

Notable members
Tina Manning, d. 1979, water rights activist and wife of American Indian Movement chairman, John Trudell, 1972-1979. (She and several family members were killed in a suspicious house fire.)

Highways

  - Idaho State Highway 51 heads north to Bruneau and on to Mountain Home and Interstate 84 (indirect connection via its Business Loop).
  - Nevada State Route 225 heads south to Elko and Interstate 80

References

External links

 Duck Valley Shoshone-Paiute Tribes (official website)
 Duck Valley Indian Reservation, Idaho/Nevada United States Census Bureau

Northern Paiute
Western Shoshone
American Indian reservations in Nevada
American Indian reservations in Idaho
Geography of Elko County, Nevada
Native American tribes in Idaho
Native American tribes in Nevada
Geography of Owyhee County, Idaho